The Senior men's race at the 1973 IAAF World Cross Country Championships was held in Waregem, Belgium, at the Hippodroom Waregem on March 17, 1973.  A report on the event was given in the Glasgow Herald.

Complete results, medallists, 
 and the results of British athletes were published.

Race results

Senior men's race (11.98 km)

Individual

Teams

Note: Athletes in parenthesis did not score for the team result

Participation
An unofficial count yields the participation of 156 athletes from 19 countries in the Senior men's race, one athlete less than the official number published.

 (8)
 (9)
 (9)
 (9)
 (9)
 (9)
 (9)
 (9)
 (8)
 (8)
 (7)
 (9)
 (9)
 (9)
 (8)
 (2)
 (8)
 (9)
 (8)

See also
 1973 IAAF World Cross Country Championships – Junior men's race
 1973 IAAF World Cross Country Championships – Senior women's race

References

Senior men's race at the World Athletics Cross Country Championships
IAAF World Cross Country Championships